The Alexander III Equestrian egg is a jewelled Easter egg made under the supervision of the Russian jeweller Peter Carl Fabergé in 1910, for the last Tsar of Russia, Nicholas II. 

Tsar Nicholas presented the Fabergé egg to his mother the Dowager Empress, Maria Fyodorovna, wife of the previous Tsar, Alexander III.

Craftsmanship
The egg itself is carved out of rock-quartz crystal, engraved with two tied laurel leaf sprays, the upper half cloaked with platinum trelliswork and a tasseled fringe, with two consoles shaped as double-headed eagles set with rose-cut diamonds. 

A large diamond engraved with the year "1910" surmounts the egg, set in band of small roses, with a rosette border of platinum acanthus leaves. The two platinum double-headed eagles on the sides of the egg have diamond crowns. The surface of the egg between the eagles is engraved with branching patterns, adjoined at the bottom.

The lower part of the egg serves as a platform for a gold model of a statue of Tsar Alexander III on horseback, standing on a lapis lazuli base embellished with two rose-cut diamond bands, engraved with Fabergés signature, supported by cast platinum cherubs coiled into position on a base of crystal.

It is currently held in the Kremlin Armoury Museum in Moscow.

References

Sources

See also

Egg decorating

1910 works
Imperial Fabergé eggs
Alexander III of Russia
Fabergé in the Moscow Kremlin Museums